Everblack is the sixth studio album by American melodic death metal band The Black Dahlia Murder. The album was released through Metal Blade Records on June 11, 2013. It is the first release by the band to feature drummer Alan Cassidy and bassist Max Lavelle.

The album sold 13,000 copies in the United States in its first week of release and debuted at #32 on the Billboard 200.

Background
Everblack is the first album to feature new drummer Alan Cassidy, who replaced Shannon Lucas, and new bassist Max Lavelle, who replaced Ryan "Bart" Williams. Vocalist Trevor Strnad has stated in an interview that the album's name and content was an artistic rebuttal to the speculation that the band had "changed direction" as a result of participating in the 2013 Warped Tour.
Everblack was recorded at various studios: the drums were recorded at Rustbelt Studios, the guitar and bass parts were recorded at Regal Fecal, and the lead guitar and vocal parts were recorded at Audiohammer Studios. Former bassist Ryan Williams served as co-producer and engineer for the album. The cover art was created by artist Nick Keller.

Track listing

Personnel
The Black Dahlia Murder
Brian Eschbach – rhythm guitar, backing vocals
Trevor Strnad – lead vocals
Ryan Knight – lead guitar
Max Lavelle – bass
Alan Cassidy – drums
Additional personnel
 David Mahler - Hammer Dulcimer
 Mike McKensie - Intro speech on "In Hell Is Where She Waits for Me"
 Jannina Norpoth - violin
Production
Produced by The Black Dahlia Murder, Ryan "Bart" Williams
Mixing by Jason Suecof, Ryan "Bart" Williams, Alan Douches
Mastering by Alan Douches

Chart positions

References

2013 albums
The Black Dahlia Murder (band) albums
Metal Blade Records albums
Albums produced by Jason Suecof